George White (August 21, 1872 – December 15, 1953) was an American Democratic Party politician who served as the 52nd governor of Ohio.

Early life and education
George White was born on August 21, 1872 in Elmira, New York. He was the son of Charles W. and Mary S. (Back) White. He attended Princeton College in Princeton, New Jersey.

Career
After mining in the Klondike, Yukon, he settled in Marietta, Ohio to drill for oil.

After serving in the Ohio House of Representatives from 1905 to 1908, White was elected to the U.S. House of Representatives in 1910, serving from 1911 to 1915. White lost a re-election bid in 1914, but won election again in 1916though he then lost again in 1918. White served as Chairman of the Democratic National Committee from 1920 to 1921.

He then returned to politics again in 1930, serving two two-year terms as governor from 1931 to 1935. He was an unsuccessful candidate for the U.S. Senate in 1934. In 1940, White ran again for the Democratic nomination for governor but lost to Martin L. Davey.

In 1936, White was influential in securing the agreement of sculptor Gutzon Borglum to create the National Start Westward Memorial of The United States,, which was completed in 1938.

Personal life
He married Charlotte McKelvy of Titusville, Pennsylvania on September 25, 1900, and had five children.

He died at West Palm Beach, Florida, December 15, 1953, and is buried at Oak Grove Cemetery in Marietta.

See also
 Election Results, Ohio Governor (Democratic Primaries)

References

External links 

 

1872 births
1953 deaths
Democratic National Committee chairs
Democratic Party governors of Ohio
Democratic Party members of the Ohio House of Representatives
Princeton University alumni
Candidates in the 1932 United States presidential election
20th-century American politicians
Politicians from Elmira, New York
Politicians from Marietta, Ohio
Democratic Party members of the United States House of Representatives from Ohio